Richard Prime (1 April 1784 – 7 November 1866) was a British Conservative Party politician.

He was elected as a Member of Parliament (MP) for the Western division of Sussex at a by-election in February 1847, and held the seat until he resigned from the House of Commons on  28 January 1854 through appointment as Steward of the Chiltern Hundreds.

References

External links 

1784 births
1866 deaths
Conservative Party (UK) MPs for English constituencies
UK MPs 1841–1847
UK MPs 1847–1852
UK MPs 1852–1857